Minore is a closed railway station on the Main West railway line in New South Wales, Australia. The station opened in 1887 and closed to passenger services in 1975, with the station building subsequently demolished. The platform and a safeworking hut remain.

References

Disused regional railway stations in New South Wales
Railway stations in Australia opened in 1887
Railway stations closed in 1975
Main Western railway line, New South Wales